Seth Wescott (born June 28, 1976) is an American snowboarder.  He is a two-time Olympic champion in the snowboard cross.

Life and career
Wescott was born in Durham, North Carolina, and lives in Whistler, British Columbia. Growing up, Wescott went to Mount Blue regional school district in Farmington, Maine. His father Jim Wescott was the Track and Cross Country coach at Colby College. He began snowboarding at age 10, but had also grown up skiing. In 1989, after competing in both sports for a few years, he stopped skiing to focus mainly on snowboarding. Wescott attended Carrabassett Valley Academy where he studied and trained with fellow Olympians Bode Miller, Jeff Greenwood, Kirsten Clark and Emily Cook. He started out at Sugarloaf in Carrabassett Valley, Maine.

In his Olympic debut, at the 2006 Winter Olympics in Torino, Italy, Wescott won gold in the snowboard cross as the first Olympic champion in the event.  Having won gold, Wescott was invited to meet president George W. Bush, but turned down the offer, citing his opposition to Bush's foreign and domestic policies. At the 2010 Winter Olympics in Vancouver, British Columbia, Canada, Wescott successfully defended his Olympic gold. Wescott, who started off the race in fourth, slowly advanced throughout the field until the end, when he narrowly defeated hometown favorite Mike Robertson on the final jump.

Wescott co-owns The Rack, a restaurant and bar near Sugarloaf that caters food and drinks to skiers and snowboarders.

On February 25, 2010, Wescott appeared on The Colbert Report. In 2012, he participated in Fox's dating game show The Choice.

Wescott attended Western State College in Gunnison, CO.

References

External links
 
 
 
 
 
 
 
 
 
 NBC Olympics 
 Official website 

1976 births
American male snowboarders
Living people
Olympic gold medalists for the United States in snowboarding
Sportspeople from Durham, North Carolina
People from Franklin County, Maine
Snowboarders at the 2006 Winter Olympics
Snowboarders at the 2010 Winter Olympics
X Games athletes
Olympic medalists in snowboarding
Medalists at the 2010 Winter Olympics
Medalists at the 2006 Winter Olympics
Participants in American reality television series
Sportspeople from Maine
20th-century American people
21st-century American people